Amphiporeia is a genus of amphipods in the family Bathyporeiidae. There are at least three described species in Amphiporeia.

Species
These three species belong to the genus Amphiporeia:
 Amphiporeia gigantea Bousfield, 1973
 Amphiporeia lawrenciana Shoemaker, 1929
 Amphiporeia virginiana Shoemaker, 1933

References

Amphipoda
Articles created by Qbugbot